Zdzisław Ignacy Nowak (25 February 1928 – 25 November 2000) was a Polish ice hockey player.

Career 
During his career, Nowak played for KTH Krynica and Legia Warsaw. He was also a member of the Polish national team at the 1956 Winter Olympics, and the 1955 and 1957 World Championships. Nowak won the Polish league championship five times, with KTH Krynica in 1950, and with Legia from 1952 to 1955.

References

External links
 

1928 births
2000 deaths
Ice hockey players at the 1956 Winter Olympics
KTH Krynica players
Legia Warsaw (ice hockey) players
Olympic ice hockey players of Poland
People from Krynica-Zdrój
Polish ice hockey centres
Sportspeople from Opole